Valentyna Kozyr (born 25 April 1950) is a former Soviet athlete who competed mainly in the high jump.

Kozyr trained at Dynamo in Kiev. She competed for the USSR in the 1968 Summer Olympics held in Mexico City in the high jump where she won the bronze medal.

References

 Sports Reference

1950 births
Soviet female high jumpers
Ukrainian female high jumpers
Dynamo sports society athletes
Olympic bronze medalists for the Soviet Union
Athletes (track and field) at the 1968 Summer Olympics
Olympic athletes of the Soviet Union
Living people
Medalists at the 1968 Summer Olympics
Olympic bronze medalists in athletics (track and field)
Sportspeople from Chernivtsi